The 1944 municipal election was held November 1, 1944 to elect a mayor and five aldermen to sit on Edmonton City Council and three trustees to sit on the public school board, while three trustees were acclaimed to the separate school board.  This was the first election to be held on the first Wednesday of November rather than the second Wednesday, in order to avoid future conflicts with the Armistice Day holiday, as happened in 1936 and 1942.

There were ten aldermen on city council, but five of the positions were already filled: James McCrie Douglas (SS), Harry Ainlay (SS), Winslow Hamilton, Charles Gariepy, and Melvin Downey (SS) were all elected to two-year terms in 1943 and were still in office.

There were seven trustees on the public school board, but four of the positions were already filled: Albert Ottewell (SS), Bertram Robertson, Frank Newson, and Roy Sutherland had been elected to two-year terms in 1943 and were still in office.  The same was true of the separate board, where William Wilde (SS), Joseph Gallant, Thomas Malone, and J O Pilon were continuing.

Voter turnout

There were 9,948 ballots cast out of 61,033 eligible voters, for a voter turnout of 16.4%.

Results

 bold or  indicates elected
 italics indicate incumbent
 "SS", where data is available, indicates representative for Edmonton's South Side, with a minimum South Side representation instituted after the city of Strathcona, south of the North Saskatchewan River, amalgamated into Edmonton on February 1, 1912.

Mayor

Aldermen

Public school trustees

Separate (Catholic) school trustees

Adrian Crowe (SS), Francis Killeen, and James O'Hara were acclaimed.

References

Election History, City of Edmonton: Elections and Census Office

1944
1944 elections in Canada
1944 in Alberta